Leptobrachium smithi (common name Smith's litter frog) is a species of frog found in Southeast Asia. Its specific name honours Malcolm Arthur Smith, one of the early herpetologists to study the amphibians of Thailand.

Description
Leptobrachium smithi is a moderate-sized Leptobrachium, with males measuring  snout-vent length and females  SVL. They have a relatively big, depressed head with striking eyes with upper half of iris scarlet or yellow. Skin above is nearly smooth but with minute granules scattered behind, especially around vent; ventrally granular.

Distribution
Its type locality is Ton Nam Plu Waterfall, Khao Chong, in Trang Province, southern Thailand. It is also known from adjacent southern Myanmar and from Laos. It may also occur in northeastern India and Bangladesh and in Peninsular Malaysia (Pulau Langkawi). Prior to its description, it was confused with Leptobrachium hasseltii and Leptobrachium pullum. Leptobrachium smithi is a locally common species that is found on the ground in evergreen forest in monsoon and rainforest climatic regions, as well as dense mixed deciduous forest. Tadpoles are found in deep sections of forest streams with little current.

References

External links
Amphibian and Reptiles of Peninsular Malaysia - Leptobrachium smithi

smithi
Amphibians of Laos
Amphibians of Malaysia
Amphibians of Myanmar
Amphibians of Thailand
Amphibians described in 1999
Taxa named by Masafumi Matsui